William Skinner may refer to:

William Skinner (MP) (1596–1627), MP for Great Grimsby, 1626
William Skinner (British Army officer) (1700–1780), British military engineer
William Skinner (North Carolina general) (1728–1798), general in the North Carolina militia during the American Revolution
William Skinner (bishop) (1778–1857), bishop of Aberdeen in the Scottish Episcopal Church
William Skinner (ethnographer) (1857–1946), New Zealand surveyor, historian, and ethnographer
William I. Skinner (1812–1891), American politician from New York
G. William Skinner (1925–2008), American anthropologist and scholar of China
William W. Skinner (1874–1953), American chemist, conservationist, and college football coach
William C. Skinner (1855–1922), president of Colt's Manufacturing Company
William Henry Skinner (1838–1915), Welsh architect who migrated to New Zealand
William Skinner of Corra (1823–1901), town clerk of Edinburgh
William Skinner (EastEnders), fictional character from EastEnders spin-off "CivvyStreet"

See also
Will Skinner (disambiguation)